Ferrell Nunatak is a nunatak protruding from the ice surface of Iroquois Plateau  northeast of Elmers Nunatak, in the Pensacola Mountains of Antarctica. It was mapped by the United States Geological Survey from surveys and U.S. Navy air photos, 1956–66, and was named by the Advisory Committee on Antarctic Names for James T. Ferrell, a construction mechanic at Ellsworth Station, winter 1958.

References 

Nunataks of Queen Elizabeth Land